Francyne Aparecida Jacintho (born 16 July 1992) is a Brazilian volleyball player who has represented her country in  world championships. She is a member of the Brazil women's national volleyball team.

She was part of the Brazil national indoor volleyball team at the  2010 Women's Pan-American Volleyball Cup, and 2016 Montreux Volley Masters.

She participated at the 2018 FIVB Volleyball Women's Club World Championship.

Clubs 
 2016 Rexona-Sesc
 2018 Praia Clube

References

External links 

 FIVB profile
 Brazilian Francyne Aparecida Jacintho jumps to spike at the net.

Brazilian women's volleyball players
1992 births
Living people
Middle blockers